Dariusz Czykier (born 21 February 1966) is a retired Polish football midfielder.

References

1966 births
Living people
Polish footballers
Jagiellonia Białystok players
Legia Warsaw players
Radomiak Radom players
Zagłębie Lubin players
Wigry Suwałki players
Association football midfielders
Sportspeople from Białystok